"Love Is Holy" is the first single from Love Is, a 1992 album by English singer Kim Wilde. It was written by American songwriting duo Rick Nowels and Ellen Shipley. Wilde travelled to Los Angeles to do three live tracks with Nowels, and during her time there, he played her "Love Is Holy", and she took to it instantly. They recorded it the following day and released it as a single in April 1992. The single reached the top 20 in several countries.

A remix subtitled "Ambient Mix" is included on the 12-inch and CD single formats, and the B-side of the single is a song called "Birthday Song", written by Wilde and her brother about his new daughter, Scarlett.

Critical reception
Mike DeGagne from AllMusic described the song as "bright and lively" with a "typical yet congenial" pop melody. Music & Media wrote that Wilde "has given up the bombastic leanings on some of her most recent work in favour of a more direct guitars-upfront approach. They also called it a "poppy and Bangles-like tune". Simon Williams of NME noted that the track sees "Kim go for the shagfrenzy Belinda Carlisle approach".

Track listings
7-inch: MCA / KIM 15 (UK)
 "Love Is Holy" – 4:02
 "Birthday Song" – 5:06

12-inch: MCA / KIMT 15 (UK)
 "Love Is Holy" – 4:02
 "Love Is Holy" (Ambient mix) – 4:43
 "Birthday Song" – 5:06

CD: MCA / KIMTD 15 (UK)
 "Love Is Holy" – 4:02
 "Birthday Song" – 5:06
 "Love Is Holy" (Ambient mix) – 4:43
 "You Came" (Shep Pettibone remix) – 7:37

CD: MCD 18636
 "Love Is Holy" – 4:02
 "Birthday Song" – 5:06
 "Love Is Holy" (Ambient mix) – 4:43

Charts

References

Kim Wilde songs
1992 singles
1992 songs
Song recordings produced by Rick Nowels
Songs written by Ellen Shipley
Songs written by Rick Nowels